Filip Lukšík (born 3 February 1985) is a Slovak football defender who plays for German club Neustrelitz.

Club career
In 2010, he was join to Odra Wodzisław and played in polish Ekstraklasa. On 27 June 2011, he has signed two-year contract with option for Dutch club ADO Den Haag for an undisclosed fee. He was sent off in his ADO debut against FK Tauras in 1st leg of the 2011–12 UEFA Europa League 2nd qualifying round after his foul in the penalty area.

International career
Lukšík made his national team debut in a 1–0 away win against Andorra on 26 March 2011.

External links
 
Slovan Bratislava profile 

1985 births
Living people
Sportspeople from Banská Bystrica
Association football fullbacks
Slovak footballers
Slovakia international footballers
FK Dukla Banská Bystrica players
SK Sigma Olomouc players
AS Trenčín players
Odra Wodzisław Śląski players
FK Senica players
ŠK Slovan Bratislava players
ADO Den Haag players
Spartak Myjava players
1. FC Saarbrücken players
FC Erzgebirge Aue players
TSG Neustrelitz players
Slovak Super Liga players
2. Bundesliga players
Czech First League players
Ekstraklasa players
Eredivisie players
Oberliga (football) players
Slovak expatriate footballers
Expatriate footballers in the Czech Republic
Expatriate footballers in Poland
Expatriate footballers in the Netherlands
Expatriate footballers in Germany
Slovak expatriate sportspeople in the Czech Republic
Slovak expatriate sportspeople in Poland
Slovak expatriate sportspeople in the Netherlands
Slovak expatriate sportspeople in Germany